Gerald Conway (born 11 September 1947) is an English folk and rock drummer/percussionist, best known for having performed with the backing band for Cat Stevens in the 1970s, Jethro Tull during the 1980s, and a member of Fairport Convention from 1998 to 2022, alongside various side projects. Conway has done a considerable amount of work as a session musician. Conway is married to vocalist Jacqui McShee, who is the singer of Pentangle, a band Conway is also a member of.

History 
Conway was born in King's Lynn, Norfolk.  

In the 1970s, he was the drummer for the band Fotheringay as well as for Eclection (other members included Kerrilee Male, Georg Kajanus [as George Hultgreen], Michael Rosen and Trevor Lucas). In their early years, Steeleye Span also drafted in the services of Conway, who was a friend of the band. Conway played on their now-classic song "Dark-Eyed Sailor" and several others from their first album, Hark! The Village Wait (1970), which album also featured contributions from Dave Mattacks, who Conway later replaced in Fairport.  His studio works also include the debut solo albums of Sandy Denny and Shelagh McDonald, and appearances on albums by Wizz Jones, John Cale, Jim Capaldi and others. He was also one of the drummers on Whatever's for Us, the debut album of Joan Armatrading in 1972. He toured and recorded as a member of Cat Stevens' band for six years.

Conway was a consistent member of the close knit Cat Stevens backing band throughout the mid-1970s. When Stevens gave up his pop music career at the close of the decade, Conway performed on Daydo; the short-lived solo album of singer-songwriter Alun Davies, another long-term member of Stevens' band. During the 1980s, Conway also toured and recorded with Kate & Anna McGarrigle.

Conway joined Jethro Tull for their album Broadsword and the Beast and also played on their Grammy-award winning album Crest of a Knave.

Conway played drums in Fairport Convention from 1998 to 2022 and occasionally plays for Pentangle. In the years since 2006, Davies has re-joined with Stevens (now known as Yusuf Islam). Both Conway and Davies additionally play in a side project called "Good Men in the Jungle", which features Davies' daughter, Becky Moncurr.

Discography

With Eclection
 Eclection (1968)

With Steeleye Span
 Hark! The Village Wait (1969)

With Al Stewart
 Zero She Flies (1970)

With Cat Stevens
 Teaser and the Firecat (1971) 
 Catch Bull at Four (1972)
 Foreigner (1973)
 Buddha and the Chocolate Box (1974)
 Saturnight (1974)
 Numbers (1975)
 Back to Earth (1978)
 Majikat (2004)

With Mike McGear
 Woman (1972)
 McGear (1974)

With Kate & Anna McGarrigle
 Entre la jeunesse et la sagesse (1980)

With Jethro Tull
 The Broadsword and the Beast (1982)
 Crest of a Knave (1987)

With Fairport Convention
 Rosie (1973) Appeared on three tracks
 The Wood and the Wire (1999)
 XXXV (2002)
 Over the Next Hill (2004)
 Sense of Occasion (2007)
 Festival Bell (2011)
 By Popular Request (2012)
 Myths and Heroes (2015)
 50:50@50 (2017)
 Shuffle and Go (2020)

With Iain Matthews
If You Saw Thro' My Eyes (1971)

References

External links
 Biography at Jethro Tull official website
Good Men in the Jungle MySpace page

1947 births
Living people
British folk rock musicians
English rock drummers
English session musicians
Fairport Convention members
Jethro Tull (band) members
People educated at William Ellis School
People from King's Lynn
Pentangle (band) members
Fotheringay members
The Bunch members
Grimms members